Nothin Personal is the debut mixtape by American rapper Cozz and was released on January 4, 2016 by Dreamville Records and Tha Committee Records.

Background
The mixtape includes features from label-mate Bas, as well as Boogie, Correy C, and Free Akrite. The production of this mixtape is mostly handled by Meez, but includes guest producers from D2, T. Lew, and Mike Almighty.

Singles
On December 8, 2015, Cozz announced the mixtape while releasing two new songs which appeared on the Dreamville compilation album, Revenge of the Dreamers II, "Tabs" and "Grow". On December 31, Cozz announced the release date of the mixtape along with releasing "My Side" on the same day. A day before the mixtape's release, Cozz shared another single, titled "Who Said", on January 3, 2016. On February 25, he released the official music video for "Tabs" featuring Bas. On May 27, the single "My Side" was made available to Spotify with the official music video being released on May 31.

Critical reception

Upon its release, Nothin Personal received generally positive reviews from critics. Scott Glaysher of HipHopDX rated the mixtape 3 out 5 saying, "[it's] pretty clear that Cozz considers himself underrated amongst his rap peers, as he mentions that idea frequently" and "[only] a year removed from that solo debut, Cozz still has a lot of time to show and prove. Nothin Personal isn’t exactly perfection or an obvious contender for “2016 project of the year,” but it’s good enough to keep us from writing Cozz off, for now." Paul A. Thompson of Pitchfork Media gave the mixtape a 6.9 out of 10 saying "His new offering, Nothin Personal, is a low-concept stroll through the Crip-controlled blocks of Cozz’s youth."

Track listing

References

2016 mixtape albums
Dreamville Records albums